Lana Harch (born 23 November 1984 in Hampton, Queensland, Australia) is a former Australia women's national soccer team international who plays for Queensland Lions FC.

Harch was adjudged player of the match in the 2008–09 W-League Grand Final and was the W-League Player of the Year.

In November 2013, Harch retired from football.

Harch graduated from the University of Southern Queensland and currently works as a teacher at the Westside Christian College in Goodna, Ipswich.

International goals

Honours

Individual
 2009 Julie Dolan Medal: Best player in the 2008–09 W-League

Club
 2008–09 W-League Premiership and Championship with Brisbane Roar

References

1984 births
Living people
Australian women's soccer players
Brisbane Roar FC (A-League Women) players
A-League Women players
University of Southern Queensland alumni
Women's association football forwards